Sukkur District is a district in Sindh Province in Pakistan. It is divided into 5 administrative townships (tehsils, also called "talukas"), namely: Sukkur City, New Sukkur, Rohri, Saleh Pat and Pano Aqil. Among them Sukkur City and New Sukkur are urban centres, while Pano Aqil is famous for having one of the largest military cantonments of the country. Rohri is the smallest tehsil of Sukkur District, both in area and population, but it has an important railway junction.
Two districts have been split off from the territory of Sukkur: Shikarpur in 1977 and Ghotki in 1993.

Administrative subdivisions

History

The East India Company occupied Sindh in 1843; They formed three districts in Sindh administratively: Hyderabad, Karachi and Shikarpur.
In 1883 British Government shifted the district headquarter from Shikarpur to Sukkur and in 1901 again British Government shifted the district status from Shikarpur to Sukkur. At the time of Pakistan's independence in 1947, Sukkur district comprised approximately 200,000 inhabitants, mostly engaged in agricultural pursuits and fishing industry. Over time, Sukkur has seen a moderate rise in population (2 to 2.5% per annum) as compared to Pakistan's, except in late 1960s and early 70s when population growth rate reached 4.43% (1972 census) due to internal migration and establishment of some large bridges on river Indus.

Sukkur district is chiefly populated by Muslims that constitute 96% of the total population. The minorities include: Hindus 3.28% and Christians about 0.51%. Hindus are mostly settled in urban areas and are engaged in the trade and services sectors. The independence of Pakistan in 1947 saw the influx of Muslims which include  Urdu-speaking Muhajirs, Bandhani-speaking Rajputs from Rajasthan, Memons from Bombay, Gujarat and Kathiawar were migrated from India and settled here, mostly in the aftermath of riots when Pakistan was carved out of India as the result of Muslim vote; the Muslim population of India voted for their separate homeland, the Pakistan. While some of the Bandhani, Memons, and Punjabis were settled here before partition, i.e., the independence of Pakistan in 1947.  Traditionally Memons were associated with trade and retail business but during last two decades they have ascended as an active social and economic front. Sukkur is noteworthy in Sindh and Pakistan generally for its comparative tolerance towards religious and ethnic minorities. City is a multi-ethnic and has a mix of Sindhis, Punjabis, Brahuis, Balochis and Pakhtuns. Sindhis are native to the area and speak its various dialects, including, Utradi, Lari, Thari, Dadhki, etc. A large number of Punjabis were attracted to the city after the Indus treaty settlement and are settled around the downtown and chowk Ghantaghar in central part of the city. Most Pakhtuns are distinct and separately living near the railway station and its vicinity. The city therefore has cosmopolitan atmosphere with multiethnic and multicultural communities.
Following are the demographic indicators of the district.

Demographics

At the time of the 2017 census, Sukkur district had a population of 1,488,372, of which 720,806 (48.43%) lived in urban areas. Sukkur had a sex ratio of 917 females per 1000 males and a literacy rate of 54.73%: 65.62% for males and 42.75% for females.

The majority religion is Islam, with 96.10% of the population. Hinduism (including those from Scheduled Castes) is practiced by 3.55% of the population.

At the time of the 2017 census, 83.63% of the population spoke Sindhi, 9.19% Urdu, 3.11% Punjabi, 1.39% Saraiki and 1.02% Pashto as their first language.

List of Dehs
The following is a list of Sukkur District's dehs, organised by taluka:

 City Sukkur Taluka (1 deh)
 New Sukkur
 New Sukkur Taluka (21 dehs)
 Abad Jagir
 Alif Katco
 Anghaho
 Arain
 Bagerji
 Belo Bagerji
 Belo Bindi
 Belo Shah Belo
 Belo9 Qadirpur
 Deda
 Dreha
 Farash
 Goseji
 Katcho Mando Dero Dero
 Mubrakpur
 Naseer Abad
 Old Sukkur
 Pacco Bindi Dhareja
 Rehuja
 Saeedabad
 Tanmachani
 Pano Aqil Taluka (96 dehs)
 Agro
 Aro
 Arrero
 Baghpai
 Bahman
 Baiji New
 Baiji Old
 Bakabad
 Belo Abad Malhani
 Belo Bahab
 Belo Hingoro
 Belo Khia Belo
 Belo Kotho
 Belo Qadir Dino
 Belo Sadhuja
 Belo Shah Belo
 Belo Shahpur
 Bhandki
 Bhullo
 Bilhani
 Bindi Tharachani
 Birth
 Bohi
 Budh
 Chanjani Chachar
 Chanjani Jatoi
 Chechero
 Dadloi
 Dandh Marhari
 Doghar
 Drib
 Erazi Sadiki
 Farakpur
 Gagni
 Gajaro
 Garkho
 Garwar
 Gharee
 Haleji
 Hasul
 Hingoro
 Hussain Beli
 Indharki
 Janaji
 Jhabero
 Jhan Khan
 Junas
 Katcho Kadirdino
 Katcho No. 1
 Katcho No. 2
 Katcho Qasimpur
 Katcho Shahpur
 Katta
 Khan Belo
 Kharaj
 Kot Sadik Shah
 Lanjari
 Lathwaro
 Liskani
 Machi
 Mangarki
 Meehoi
 Mian Kundho
 Miranpur Sadiki
 Mubarakpur
 Nangroro
 Naro Amul Hatti
 Naro Hamthar
 Nindapur
 Nirch
 Nouraja New
 Nouraja Old
 Nowlai
 Ochihar
 Pacco Bindi Shahpur
 Pano Aqil
 Pano Ghulam Ali
 Pano KharKhaso
 Panwari Jagir
 Panwari Rayaeti
 Qadirdino Bindi
 Roophar
 Sabni
 Sadhuja
 Salhani
 Sangi Kotai
 Sarai
 Shahpur
 Sorho
 Sugro
 Sultanpur
 Sunder Belo
 Talli
 Tarar
 Thikratho
 Ural
 Rohri Taluka (67 dehs)
 Abad
 Abejano
 Abra
 Akbarpur
 Allah Abad
 Arkohar
 Arore
 Begmanji
 Bhiro
 Boraha
 Bundtari
 Chak No. 2
 Chak No. 3
 Chak No. 4
 Cheel
 Dadah
 Dakhano
 Dalho
 Dhandhi
 Dodanko
 Dring Belo
 Dubarwahan
 Fakirabad
 Gatanwari
 Ghulam Goth
 Gidraro
 Hamanloi
 Hamanloi Jagir
 Hosho Shaheed
 Ibupota
 Jani Abad
 Jhangro
 Kalari
 Kalhori
 Kandhra
 Kandri
 Katcho Ali Wahan
 Katcho Mando Dero
 Katohar
 Katper
 Khadhari
 Khahi Jagir
 Khoori
 Kot Mir Yako
 Kotari
 Larh Jagir
 Mandodero
 Mangarki
 Mangria
 Mari
 Mari Janullah Shah
 Miani Bagat
 Nabi Shah
 Nandho Kohistan
 Panhwar
 Patni
 Ponath
 Rohri
 Saeedabad (Rohri)
 Sangrar
 Seerahi
 Subhanpur
 Tirore
 Trimoh Takar
 Trimoonh
 Umerkas
 Wado Kohistan
 Saleh Patt Taluka (87 dehs)
 Badal Fakeer
 Badeji
 Bago
 Bahadurio
 Bajar Waro
 Bargah
 Barro
 Beebai Daro
 Behan Wari
 Berrido
 Bitri
 Chak No. 5
 Chanareji
 Chogan Waro
 Chuganwari
 Chutto Khouh
 Dhulwaro
 Draban Waro
 Dubbo
 Dubi
 Gagro
 Gandaho
 Garang
 Garhar
 Goni
 Gurand
 Hussain Shah
 Ihsan Wari
 Januji
 Kanheja
 Kartar
 Khabar Waro
 Khabariro
 Khabri Bhit
 Khipro
 Khorore
 Khosanjo Kumb
 Khuni Khambharo
 Lairo
 Laiwari
 Lakhaji No. 1
 Lakhaji No. 2
 Looli Takar
 Lundi Bhit
 Lundiro
 Lundo
 Mahar
 Malaho
 Malik
 Mamro
 Manikwari
 Matto MAngrio
 Muhib Shah
 Murado
 Nihrad
 Panhwari
 Phat
 Phulokri
 Pir Buxji Bhit
 Pir Karo
 Rajar
 Registan Kartar
 Registan Mamro
 Rip
 Sadano
 Sadri
 Sahi Pat
 Sanghar
 Sanhari
 Sahnaro
 Setharo
 Shadmano
 Shah Nawaz Shah
 Siran Waro
 Soomarji
 Soonharo
 Sunhari Takar
 Tarai
 Thomi
 Tooryoun
 Udhar
 Ukri Takar
 Umerji
 Umerji Kandun
 Veenghko
 Viyari
 Wass

References

Notes

Bibliography

 
Districts of Sindh